Hatun Jacacocha or Hatunjacacocha (possibly from Quechua hatun big, qaqa rock, qucha lake, "big rock lake") is a lake in Peru located in the Ancash Region, Huari Province, Huantar District.

Close to Hatun Jacacocha there is a smaller lake named Ichic Jacacocha (possibly from Quechua Ichik Qaqaqucha, ichik little, "little rock lake"). Both lakes are connected by a stream which flows to the Carhuazcancha valley (Qarwakancha) in the north.

Both lakes lie in the Huascarán National Park. They are surrounded by qiwuña (Polylepis) and ichhu (Stipa ichu). Plants like kiswar (Buddleja incana), champa estrella (Plantago rigida) and purwa (or qaqapa pisqun) (Lycopodium crassum) grow at Hatun Jacacocha and there are trouts in the lake.

At the shore of Ichic Jacacocha you find lliqllish qura (Werneria nubigena), ankush (Senecio canescens) and wiqlla (Tillandsia fendleri). This is also a place to watch birds like the plain-tailed warbling finch (Poospiza alticola) and the cinereous conebill (Conirostrum cinereum).

See also 
 Carhuascancha
 Huantsan

References 

Lakes of Peru
Lakes of Ancash Region